The citron-crested cockatoo (Cacatua sulphurea citrinocristata) is a medium-sized cockatoo with an orange crest, dark grey beak, pale orange ear patches, and strong feet and claws. The underside of the larger wing and tail feathers have a pale yellow color. The eyelid color is a very light blue. Both sexes are similar. Females have a coppered colored eye where as the male has a very dark black eye.

The smallest of the yellow-crested cockatoo subspecies, it is endemic to Sumba in the Lesser Sunda Islands in Indonesia. The diet consists mainly of seeds, buds, fruits, nuts and herbaceous plants.

In 2022, Birdlife International recognized the citron-crested cockatoo as a separate species, Cacatua citrinocristata.

Conservation status

The citron-crested cockatoo is a critically endangered bird whose population has declined due to habitat loss and illegal trapping for the cage-bird trade. A 1993 survey of Sumba estimated the species' numbers at less than 2,000 individuals. By 2012, the estimate had dropped to 563.  Together with the other subspecies of the yellow-crested cockatoo, it is listed in appendix I of the CITES list. Consequently, international trade is strongly regulated and trade in wild caught citron-crested cockatoos is illegal.

References

External links 

Royal Society for the Protection of Birds website - threats to wild bird populations

citron-crested cockatoo
Birds of the Lesser Sunda Islands
Parrots of Asia
citron-crested cockatoo
citron-crested cockatoo

de:Orangehaubenkakadu